Jerzy Janowicz and Jürgen Zopp were the defending champions but decided not to participate.
Dominik Meffert and Philipp Oswald defeated Jamie Delgado and Andreas Siljeström 3–6, 7–6(7–0), [10–7] in the final to win the title.

Seeds

Draw

Draw

External Links
 Main Draw

Tunis Openandnbsp;- Doubles
2013 Doubles